Big Creek Airport may refer to:

 Big Creek Airport (Belize) in Big Creek, Belize (IATA: BGK)
 Big Creek Airport (Idaho) in Big Creek, Idaho, United States (FAA: U60)